When a Man's a Man is a 1924 American silent Western film directed by Edward F. Cline and starring John Bowers, Marguerite De La Motte, and Robert Frazer.

Plot
As described in a film magazine review, Lawrence Knight, a millionaire loafer, is rejected by his sweetheart Helen Wakefield because he has never done anything worthy of a man. He goes west and obtains work at a ranch in Arizona. Although at first a tenderfoot, he masters the art of riding and roping and becomes a close friend of the foreman, Phil Acton. After attending school in the east, Phil's sweetheart, Kitty Reid, returns to her father's ranch and, believing that she can no longer endure ranch life, tells Phil that she cannot marry him. Phil becomes jealous of Knight and comes to believe that he is in league with a gang of cattle thieves. During a trip to the hills, Phil is shot in the back and seriously wounded by a cattle thief. Knight is accused of the deed, but proves his innocence just before he is to be hanged. Following the shooting of Phil, Kitty decides that she does love him after all and consents to marry him. Knight buys a ranch and presents it to Phil as a wedding gift.

Cast

Production

When a Man's a Man was filmed on location in and around Prescott, Arizona. Bowers broke his leg in a scene while bulldogging a steer.

Preservation
An incomplete copy of When a Man's a Man is held by the UCLA Film and Television Archive.

References

Bibliography
 Darby, William (1991). Masters of Lens and Light: A Checklist of Major Cinematographers and Their Feature Films. Scarecrow Press.

External links

1924 films
1924 Western (genre) films
Films directed by Edward F. Cline
First National Pictures films
American black-and-white films
Films based on American novels
Silent American Western (genre) films
1920s English-language films
1920s American films